Bell-Sherrod House is a historic home located at Enfield, Halifax County, North Carolina. It was built about 1859, and is a two-story, rectangular, Italianate-style frame dwelling, with a Greek Revival-style front porch.  It has a shingled hip roof pierced by two interior chimneys and is sheathed in weatherboard.  A conservatory was added about 1915. The house was restored about 1987.

It was listed on the National Register of Historic Places in 1988.

References

Houses on the National Register of Historic Places in North Carolina
Greek Revival houses in North Carolina
Italianate architecture in North Carolina
Houses completed in 1859
Houses in Halifax County, North Carolina
National Register of Historic Places in Halifax County, North Carolina
1859 establishments in North Carolina